My Friend Sainfoin is a French comedy film from 1950, directed by Marc-Gilbert Sauvajon, based on a novel by Paul-Adrien Schaye, and starring Pierre Blanchar. The film features Louis de Funès as guide.

Cast 
 Pierre Blanchar: Sainfoin, friend and shopper
 Sophie Desmarets: Eugénie de Puycharmois, Guillaume's wife
 Jacqueline Porel: Yolande, the driver
 Denise Grey: Eugénie's mother
 Alfred Adam: Guillaume de Puycharmois, Eugénie's husband
 Jean Hebey: the cabaret artist
 Henry Charrett: father Machin
 Louis de Funès: guide
 Eugène Frouhins: the peasant
 Albert Michel: the boy
 Nicolas Amato: the doctor

References

External links 
 

1950 films
French comedy films
1950s French-language films
French black-and-white films
Films based on French novels
1950 comedy films
Films directed by Marc-Gilbert Sauvajon
1950s French films